The 2010 Cup of China was the third event of six in the 2010–11 ISU Grand Prix of Figure Skating, a senior-level international invitational competition series. It was held at the Capital Indoor Stadium in Beijing on November 4–7. Medals were awarded in the disciplines of men's singles, ladies' singles, pair skating, and ice dancing. Skaters earned points toward qualifying for the 2010–11 Grand Prix Final.

Schedule
(Local Time, GMT +08:00)

 Friday, November 5
 14:45 - Ice dancing short dance
 16:30 - Ladies' short program
 18:25 - Men's short program
 20:20 - Pairs' short program
 Saturday, November 6
 14:00 - Ice dancing free dance
 15:55 - Ladies' free skating
 18:05 - Men's free skating
 20:25 - Pairs' free skating
 Sunday, November 7
 Exhibition gala

Results

Men

Ladies

Pairs

Ice dancing

External links

 
 
 
 
 
 ISU entries/results page
 

Cup Of China, 2010
Cup of China
Sports competitions in Beijing
2010s in Beijing
2010 in Chinese sport